The Enemy Inside may refer to:

The Enemy Inside (Arctic Plateau album) or the title song, 2012
The Enemy Inside (Coldrain album), 2011
"The Enemy Inside" (Dream Theater song), 2013
Enemy Inside, a German rock band

See also
The Enemy Within (disambiguation)